Mesoderus is an extinct genus of predaceous diving beetles in the family Dytiscidae. There are at least four described species in Mesoderus.

Species
These four species belong to the genus Mesoderus:
 † Mesoderus magnus Prokin & Ren, 2010
 † Mesoderus ovatus Prokin, Petrov, B. Wang & Ponomarenko, 2013
 † Mesoderus punctatus Prokin, Petrov, B. Wang & Ponomarenko, 2013
 † Mesoderus ventralis Prokin & Ren, 2010

References

Dytiscidae
Prehistoric insect genera